Ahmed Shageef (born 15 November 1970) is a former Maldivian sprinter who competed in the men's 100m competition at the 1992 Summer Olympics. He recorded an 11.36, not enough to qualify for the next round past the heats. His personal best is 11.18, set in 1991. That Olympiad he also ran a 22.54 in the 200m contest. In the prior Olympics, he posted a 50.61 in the 400m race. Later, in the 1996 Summer Olympics, he was a part of the Maldives' 4 × 400 m relay team.

References

External links
 

1970 births
Living people
Maldivian male sprinters
Athletes (track and field) at the 1988 Summer Olympics
Athletes (track and field) at the 1992 Summer Olympics
Athletes (track and field) at the 1996 Summer Olympics
Olympic athletes of the Maldives